Lycurgus or Lykourgos may refer to:

People 
 Lycurgus (king of Sparta) (third century BC)
 Lycurgus (lawgiver) (eighth century BC), creator of constitution of Sparta
 Lycurgus of Athens (fourth century BC), one of the 'ten notable orators' at Athens
 Lykourgos Logothetis (1772–1850), leader of Samos in the Greek War of Independence
 Lycurgus Johnson (1818–1876), American cotton planter and politician
 Lycurgus J. Rusk (1851–1928), American politician
 Lycurgus Conner (1909–1963), American politician
 George Lycurgus (1858–1960), Greek–American businessman and Hawaiian royalist

Mythology 
 Lycurgus (mythology), name of mythological characters named Lycurgus
 Lycurgus of Arcadia, king
 Lycurgus (of Nemea), son of Pheres
 Lycurgus of Thrace, king,  opponent of Dionysus
 Lycomedes or Lycurgus, in Homer
 Lycurgus, son of Pronax
 Lycurgus, son of Heracles by Toxicrate, daughter of Thespius
 Lycurgus, a suitor of Hippodamia of Pisa

Places 
 Lycurgus, Iowa, United States, unincorporated community
 Lycurgus, New York, a fictional location in the novel An American Tragedy

Other uses 
 Lycurgus (album), a 1975 album by Peter Lang
 Lycurgus (cicada), a genus of cicadas
 Lycurgus (volleyball), volleyball club from the Netherlands
 Lycurgus Cup, a dichroidic goblet

Greek masculine given names